Kacem may refer to:

People with the given name Kacem 
Mouloud Kacem Naît Belkacem (1927–1992), Algerian politician, philosopher, historian, and writer
Kacem Bouallouche (born 1963), Moroccan wrestler
Kacem El Ghazzali (born 1990), Moroccan-Swiss secularist essayist and activist
Abou El Kacem Hadji (born 1990), Algerian football player
Kacem Kefi (1945–2018), Tunisian singer and composer
Kacem Klifa (born 1940), Moroccan gymnast
Kacem Slimani (1948–1996), Moroccan football defender

People with the surname Kacem 

Mehdi Belhaj Kacem (born 1973), French-Tunisian actor, philosopher, and writer
Mehdi Kacem, (born 1986), French-born Algerian football midfielder
Rafiq Belhaj Kacem (born 1949), Tunisian politician
Sonia Kacem (born 1985), Swiss-born artist

See also
Bab Sidi Kacem, one of the gates of the Medina of Tunis, the old capital of Tunisia
Sidi Kacem, a city in Rabat-Salé-Kénitra, Morocco
Sidi Kacem Province, province in the Moroccan economic region of Rabat-Salé-Kénitra
Cacém (disambiguation)
Kasam (disambiguation)
Kasem (disambiguation)
Kasim (disambiguation)
Kassam (disambiguation)
Kazem
Qasam (disambiguation)